Apasiri Nitibhon (RTGS: Aphasiri Nitiphon), nickname Um, is a Thai supermodel and actress. Among her starring roles is as Angsumalin in Sunset at Chaophraya in 1996. She has also been featured in Bullet Wives and The Victim.

Apasiri trained as a likay dancer in her youth. For the 2006 film, The Victim, she portrayed a beauty queen who performs a likay dance. For this role, she had to receive a refresher course in Thai classical dance.

Filmography

Films

Television

Music video appearances

Awards and nominations

References

External links

1970 births
Living people
Apasiri Nitibhon
Apasiri Nitibhon
Apasiri Nitibhon
Apasiri Nitibhon
Apasiri Nitibhon